Kenneth Porter may refer to:

 Kenneth Porter (poet) (1905–1981), American poet and historian
 Kenneth Porter (RAF officer) (1912–2003)
 Kenneth Lee Porter (1896–1988), World War I flying ace